The list of ship launches in 1796 includes a chronological list of some ships launched in 1796.


References

1796
Ship launches